Macedonian cuisine ( is the traditional cuisine of North Macedonia. It is influenced by Balkan cuisines. The relatively warm climate of the country provides excellent growth conditions for a variety of vegetables, herbs and fruits. Macedonian cuisine is also noted for the diversity and quality of its dairy products, wines, and local alcoholic beverages, such as rakija. Tavče gravče and mastika are considered the national dish and drink of North Macedonia.

Foods

 Tavče gravče
 Turli tava
 Ǵomleze, culinary speciality in the Ohrid and Struga region, different from the Turkish gozleme
 Ajvar, roasted red pepper spread; can be mild or hot
 Kebapchinja
 Šopska salad 
 Polneti piperki, stuffed bell peppers; usually filled with rice or rice with meat
 Embroidered peppers, threaded peppers served fresh, dry or as a spice
 Ohrid trout, an endemic species of trout in Lake Ohrid 
 Pita (pastry)
 Burek
 Malidžano, an eggplant spread
 Musaka
 Makalo
 Pindžur, a spicy vegetable relish
 Popara
 Pastrmalija
 Šarplaninski ovčji, or kaškaval (hard sheep's milk cheese from the Šar Mountains (Šar planina in Macedonian))
 Bieno Siren̂e, a cheese originating from the Mariovo region that shares similarities with the more commonly known halloumi
 Urda cheese
 Širden and kukurek
 Sarma
 Kisela zelka and rasolnica (sour cabbage)
 Mekici (also known as tiganici or pishii), fried lumps of dough
 Čorba od kopriva (creamy nettle soup)
 Kompir mandžа (a potato-and-meat stew)
 Pleskavica (also šarska and ajdučka)
 Kačamak (also known as bakrdan)
 Zelnik
 Selsko meso, roast beef, pork and lamb with mushrooms, white wine and yellow cheese on top, usually cooked in a clay pot
 Tarator
 Jufki, Macedonian pasta 
 Prženi lepčin̂a, slices of bread covered in beaten egg, then fried

Desserts

 Kadaif
 Med
 Tulumba
 Palačinki (Crêpe)
 Kompot
 Lokum
 Baklava
 Slatko
 Sutlijaš
 Alva

Drinks

Coffee
North Macedonia has a well-developed coffee culture, and Turkish coffee is by far the most popular coffee beverage. With over 5,000 establishments, the traditional Balkan coffeehouse and bar—the kafeana—is one of the most common places to go out and have a drink. However, because of the negative stereotypes surrounding the kafana, many younger people prefer to frequent the more Western-styled cafés which are also seen as being classier.

From the days of the Ottoman Empire through to the present, coffee has played an important role in the lifestyle and culture of the region. The serving and consumption of coffee has had a profound effect on betrothal and gender customs, political and social interaction, prayer, and hospitality customs. Although many of the rituals are not prevalent in today's society, coffee has remained an integral part of Macedonian culture.

Other coffee beverages such as lattes, cafe mochas and cappuccinos are becoming increasingly popular with the opening of more upmarket cafés. Professionals and businesspeople have contributed to the popularity of instant coffee (especially frappé).

Alcohol

 Wine
 Stanušina Crna
 Vranec
 Traminec
 Alexandria
 Smederevka
Traditionally, white wine would be consumed in the summer, and red wine, in winter.

 Mastika
  Rakija
 Beer
Skopsko
Krali Marko
Zlaten Dab
Gorsko
Bitolsko
Kenbach
Makedonsko
Starogradsko
 Boza, a drink made from millet, traditionally sold by ethnic Albanian vendors.

Non-alcoholic
 Mountain tea
 Salep
 Yoghurt (Kefir)
 Mineral water
Gorska Voda
Pelisterka
Pela Rosa
Ilina
Kožuvčanka
Ladna

See also
 European cuisine
 Cuisine of the Mediterranean
 Eastern European cuisine
 Cincinnati chili

References

 
Balkan cuisine